Yeniköy is a village in the Pertek District, Tunceli Province, Turkey. The village is populated by Kurds of the Bermaz and Pilvenk tribes and had a population of 137 in 2021.

The hamlets of Akbayır and Beşpınar are attached to the village.

References 

Kurdish settlements in Tunceli Province
Villages in Pertek District